Consecration is the solemn transfer of a person or thing to a special purpose or service.

Consecration or Consecrate may also refer to:

 Consecrations in Eastern Christianity
 Consecration: The Final Recordings Part 2, a 2002 jazz album
 Consecration (band), a Serbian alternative metal group
 Consecration (album), a 1993 album by American jazz saxophonist Charles Gayle
 "Consecrate", a song by Matt Brouwer from the 2001 album Imagerical
 Consecration, a 2023 horror film.